Raffaele Menconi (1877 — 1942) was an Italian-American sculptor.

Menconi established a practice in New York City with his brother Giuseppe (Joseph). Menconi realised the bronze architectural sculptures and fittings for a generation of Beaux-Arts architects, such as Carrère and Hastings; Menconi's bronze flagpole bases for the Fifth Avenue front of the New York Public Library (1912, illustrated) are particularly prominent. Another pair of bronze flagpole bases by Menconi, showing an American eagle and representations of the four seasons, to designs of Egerton Swartwout, stand before the Missouri State Capitol. His work also appears on the Reader's Digest building in Chappaqua New York, and in the Mount Auburn Cemetery in Cambridge, Massachusetts.

He married Josephine Zampieri; their son, Ralph J. Menconi (1915–1972), who apprenticed in his father's New York studio, was also a well-known sculptor and medalist. The Menconi Family lived in an Italianate house designed by Menconi in Hastings-on-Hudson, New York, for many years.

Notes

1877 births
1942 deaths
Italian sculptors
Italian male sculptors
20th-century American sculptors
20th-century American male artists
American male sculptors
Italian emigrants to the United States